Hillhouse Hollow is a stream valley in northeastern Wright County in the Ozarks of southern Missouri.

The stream source area is just east of Missouri Route Z and it flows northeast past the community of St. George and passing under Missouri Route H to its confluence with the Gasconade adjacent to Missouri Route T.

Hillhouse Hollow (or Hill House Hollow) was so named due to the "hill houses" located above it in pioneer days.

References

Valleys of Wright County, Missouri
Valleys of Missouri